Peter Poellner is a professor of philosophy at the University of Warwick. is research interests include phenomenology, philosophy of value, philosophy of mind, Husserl, Nietzsche.  

According to Brian Leiter, he has challenged the view that libertarian views of free will and moral responsibility are central to Western religious, moral, and cultural traditions.

References

21st-century British philosophers
Academics of the University of Warwick
Continental philosophers
Heidegger scholars
Living people
Nietzsche scholars
Phenomenologists
Sartre scholars
Husserl scholars
Year of birth missing (living people)